Sean McEntegart (born 1 March 1970) is an Irish retired footballer who played as a midfielder in the Scottish League for Hamilton Academical and Queen's Park.

Honours 
Hamilton Academical
 Scottish League Second Division second-place promotion: 1996–97

References

External links 

 

Republic of Ireland association footballers
Scottish Football League players
Queen's Park F.C. players
Association football midfielders
1970 births
Association footballers from Dublin (city)
Hamilton Academical F.C. players
Crawley Town F.C. players
Southern Football League players
Living people